Cycling were contested at the 2011 Summer Universiade from August 13 to August 20 at the Cycling Courses of Longgang Sports Center in Shenzhen, China. Men's and women's individual and team events were held.

Events
Medals will be awarded in four disciplines: track cycling, road cycling, mountain bike, and BMX. The following events were contested:

Track cycling
Keirin – men
Individual pursuit – 4 km men, 3 km women
Sprint – men, women
Points race – 30 km men, 20 km women

Road cycling
Road bicycle race – 160 km men, 120 km women
Road team time trial – 50 km men, 30 km women

Mountain bike
Mountain bike race – men, women

BMX
BMX race – men, women

Medal summary

Medal table

Track cycling

Road cycling

Mountain biking

BMX

References

 
2011 in cycle racing
2011 Summer Universiade events
Cycling at the Summer Universiade
2011 in track cycling
2011 in road cycling
2011 in mountain biking
2011 in BMX
International cycle races hosted by China